Daniel Preussner (born 9 August 1986) is a German international rugby union player, playing for the SC 1880 Frankfurt in the Rugby-Bundesliga and the German national rugby union team.

He made his debut for Germany in a friendly against Hong Kong on 12 December 2009.

Preussner, together with Rolf Wacha, has been in the line-up of the German championship final from 2008 to 2011.

Honours

Club
 German rugby union championship
 Champions: 2008, 2009
 Runners up: 2010, 2011
 German rugby union cup
 Winners: 2009, 2010

Stats
Daniel Preussner's personal statistics in club and international rugby:

Club

 As of 30 April 2012

National team

European Nations Cup

Friendlies & other competitions

 As of 24 March 2010

References

External links
 Daniel Preussner at scrum.com
   Daniel Preussner at totalrugby.de

1986 births
Living people
German rugby union players
Germany international rugby union players
SC 1880 Frankfurt players
Rugby union locks